Nicol Burne (fl. 1574–1598) was a Scottish Roman Catholic controversialist.

Life
Burne told Thomas Smeaton in Paisley that he wished to defend Catholic doctrines before the General Assembly of the Church of Scotland. Smeaton excommunicated him, and Burne was arrested. He was confined in St Andrews Castle, and then taken to the Old Tolbooth, Edinburgh. He remained there from 15 October 1580 to the end of January 1581. He was then exiled.

Works
Burne is known through his Disputation published in 1581 in Paris. In the epistle to the reader, Burne states that he was brought up a Calvinist. The work repeats slurs against John Knox and continental Protestant reformers.

References

Attribution

Year of birth missing
Year of death missing
Scottish Roman Catholics
16th-century Scottish people
16th-century Roman Catholics